Michael Reynolds, CBE, AM (born 16 September 1946) is an Australian politician. He was a Labor member of the Legislative Assembly of Queensland from 1998 to 2009, representing the district of Townsville. He served as Speaker of the Legislative Assembly of Queensland from 2006 to 2009.

Biography 
Reynolds has first elected to parliament at the 1998 state election. Before being elected as Speaker by the 52nd Parliament in 2006, he was the inaugural Minister for Child Safety from 2004 to 2006 with Ministerial responsibilities for adoptions, child protection services, foster/kinship carers etc.

Prior to the Child Safety portfolio Reynolds was the Minister for Emergency Services and Minister Assisting the Premier in North Queensland from 2001 to 2004. In Reynolds's first parliamentary term he held the position of Parliamentary Secretary to the Premier in North Queensland.

Prior to his election to parliament, Reynolds held the positions of Director, Northern Australia Social Research Institute and Director, Centre for Social and Welfare Research, both at James Cook University. He was also Visiting Professor of Local Government Studies at the University of Canberra. From 1990 to 1996 he was Chairman of the Townsville Port Authority.

Mike Reynolds' local government service has included 16 years as a member of the Townsville City Council. During this time he was Deputy Mayor of Townsville from 1976 to 1980, then Mayor of Townsville from 1980 to 1989. Reynolds was a member of the State Executive of the Local Government Association of Queensland from 1983 to 1989 and was appointed a Member of the Order of Australia in 1985 for service to local government and community.

Reynolds also acted as Chair of the Queensland Ministerial Advisory Committee on Child Care from 1991 to 1992, was a member of the Queensland Pacific Technology Program Committee in the Premiers Department from 1991 to 1992 and also was Chairman of the ACT Vocational Training Authority from 1992 to 1995.

He is a member of many local community organisations. Reynolds has lived in Townsville most of his life and he graduated with a Bachelor of Social Work (B.S.W.) from James Cook University in 1978. Reynolds's active interest in politics began in the mid 1960s and he is interested in all sport, particularly rugby league, cricket, tennis and rugby union.

Reynolds was appointed a Commander of the Order of the British Empire in the 2018 Birthday Honours, for promoting relations between Queensland and Papua New Guinea, including as Mayor of Townsville and as Patron of YWAM Medical Ships Programme, nominated by the Papua New Guinea Government.

Reynolds is the co-author of the following books - The Great Divide: A Comparative Social Profile of Northern and Southern Australia (with D Lavery, 1997); Achieving Local Ownership of National Goals for the Coastal Zone (with L Cutts and D Osborn, 1993); Education and Training for Local Government Employees in Queensland (with V Valentine, 1992). He is also a contributor to the following books: "Local Government and the Challenge of Devolution in Australia" in Decentralization Towards Democratization and Development, (edited by RP Guzman and MA Reforma, 1993); "Recognising the Role of Local Government" in What Should Government Do? (edited by P Coaldrake and JR Nethercote, 1989).

References

                   

1946 births
Living people
Members of the Queensland Legislative Assembly
Mayors of Townsville
Speakers of the Queensland Legislative Assembly
Australian Labor Party members of the Parliament of Queensland
21st-century Australian politicians
People from Manly, New South Wales